Several classes of destroyer have been known as "M". These include:

 Admiralty M-class destroyer, a class of Royal Navy destroyers built 1913–1916 and that served in World War I
 L and M-class destroyer, a class of Royal Navy destroyers launched 1939–1942 and that served in World War II
 Marcílio Dias-class destroyer, three ships of the Brazilian Navy that served in World War II

See also
 M class (disambiguation)